Southern Regional Hospital (formerly Dangriga Hospital) is a hospital serving Dangriga, Belize. It has 52 beds.

External links
Belize Guide
Southern Regional Hospital

Hospitals in Belize
Dangriga